is a Japanese politician and former actor, who is the founder and current leader of the anti-establishment political party Reiwa Shinsengumi. Yamamoto served as a member of the House of Councillors from 2013 to 2019 and was a candidate in the 2020 Tokyo gubernatorial election.

Early life
Yamamoto was born in Takarazuka, Hyogo; his father died shortly after his birth, and he and his two older sisters were raised by their mother, who sold Persian carpets. Yamamoto began his career as a television "talent" in 1990, appearing in dramas such as Futarikko (1996–97) and Shinsengumi! (2004). He also appeared in several films, including Battle Royale (2000) and Moon Child (2003).

Political career

Independent (2011–2014)
Yamamoto entered politics after the Fukushima nuclear meltdown in March 2011. He announced that he "would no longer be a silent accomplice of the terrorist nation Japan", and became a protester in the anti-nuclear movement. He resigned from his talent agency some time later in order to focus on activism. Yamamoto, a resident of Tokyo, flew to Saga Prefecture in July and attempted, along with a local citizens' group, to enter the governor's office to protest the restart of a power plant. He chanted phrases such as, "Protect our children!" "We don't need nuclear energy!" "Come out, Governor!" He did not get an audience with the governor, but said he was glad that he came. The scene was broadcast on television, and the Saga District Public Prosecutors Office considered pressing charges against Yamamoto. Following the incident, in early 2012, Yamamoto led a petition campaign in Tokyo to hold a referendum that would bar Tokyo Electric Power Company from continuing to run nuclear facilities.

He attempted to run for a seat in the House of Representatives during the 2012 general election, but placed second in the Tokyo 8th district and did not win a seat. He then ran an independent campaign (endorsed by the New Socialist Party) to be elected to the House of Councillors in the 2013 election, and was elected on 21 July. He was supported in the election by the People's Life Party, Social Democratic Party and Greens Japan.

On 31 October 2013, Yamamoto handed a political letter to the Emperor Akihito at a non-political garden party. The letter was immediately passed on to the chamberlain. Whether the letter was read by the Emperor is unknown. The letter reportedly contained his complaints about the handling of the nuclear disaster. The Huffington Post reported that the action may have violated the Constitution of Japan, since the Emperor is not allowed to involve himself in political issues. The Japanese Communist Party chairman Kazuo Shii inferred that Yamamoto "didn't understand the Constitution". Various political leaders expressed their anger and disappointment in Yamamoto's alleged abuse of his legislative position, as well as Beat Takeshi, who called the incident "somewhat of an insult". However, the manga artist Yoshinori Kobayashi supported Yamamoto's actions. On 8 November, Yamamoto received an official reprimand from the Speaker of the House of Councillors, Masaaki Yamazaki. It was also announced that he will be banned from any kind of imperial events during his entire term.

In December 2013, he promised he would mobilize a million people to lay siege to the National Diet in protest of the Special Secrecy Law. In the 19th Tokyo gubernatorial election held in February 2014, he didn't support any specific candidate, and called for supporting candidates that oppose nuclear power.

People's Life Party (PLP) (2014–2016)

In the 2014 Japanese general election, the People's Life Party (PLP) lost seats and was in danger of losing its qualification as a political party. After the election, Yamamoto joined the party, and the party name was changed to "People's Life Party & Taro Yamamoto and Friends."

In September 2015, in a vote of security-related bills of the House of Councillors plenary session, he voted while wearing mourning garb and a rosary, and gestured to offer incense to Prime Minister Shinzo Abe and the Liberal Democratic Party.

Liberal Party (2016–2019)
In October 2016, the People's Life Party was renamed to Liberal Party. 

In April 2019, the Liberal Party dissolved and merged into the Democratic Party for the People.

Reiwa Shinsengumi (2019–present)
In April 2019, Yamamoto formed a new party, left-liberal populist Reiwa Shinsengumi. In the first election the party contested, Yamamoto lost his seat in the House of Councillors after switching his electoral district from Tokyo to the party's National PR list, but he led his party to win two seats in the House of Councillors.

In June 2020, Yamamoto announced his candidacy for the 2020 Tokyo gubernatorial election. Yamamoto's campaign included a pledge to cancel the 2020 Summer Olympics and establish a direct cash relief handout program as a part of Tokyo's response to the COVID-19 pandemic. Yamamoto came in third place in the election, winning 657,277 votes, or 10.72% of the vote.

Yamamoto resigned his seat in the House of Representatives in April 2022, and announced his intention to increase his party's representation in the House of Councillors. He was replaced in the lower house by Mari Kushibuchi.

Filmography

References

External links 

 
  

1974 births
Living people
People from Takarazuka, Hyōgo
20th-century Japanese male actors
21st-century Japanese male actors
21st-century Japanese politicians
Japanese male film actors
Japanese male television actors
Japanese actor-politicians
Japanese anti–nuclear power activists
Japanese left-wing activists
Left-wing populism
Progressivism in Japan
Members of the House of Councillors (Japan)
People's Life Party politicians
Populism in Japan
Actors from Hyōgo Prefecture
Politicians from Hyōgo Prefecture